Anne of Ostfriesland (June 26, 1562 – April 21, 1621) was the eldest daughter of Count Edzard II of East Frisia and his wife, Catherine Vasa, daughter of Gustav I of Sweden.

Anne married three times:

First, on July 12, 1583 in Heidelberg, to the Elector Palatine, Louis VI.  He died on October 22 of the same year.
Second, Anne remarried on December 21, 1585, Ernest Frederick, Margrave of Baden-Durlach.  He died April 14, 1604.
Third, Anne married on March 7, 1617 in Grabow, Julius Henry, later Duke of Saxe-Lauenburg.  The duke was 26 years younger than his wife and outlived her by many decades, dying on November 20, 1665.

Anne had no living children by any of her husbands. She was buried in the Church of the Holy Spirit, Heidelberg, but her grave is not preserved.

1562 births
Electresses of the Palatinate
Remarried royal consorts
1621 deaths
House of Cirksena
Burials at the Church of the Holy Spirit, Heidelberg